The 1440 Canal, also formerly known as the Tidewater Building and Tidewater Place, located at 1440 Canal Street in the Medical District of the Central Business District of New Orleans, Louisiana, is officially a 24-story, -tall high-rise building designed by Kessels-Diboll-Kessels. The building has lesser-known 25th and 26th floors that are accessible only from the 24th floor and are much smaller in area than the other floors.

It originally was built as the corporate office for Tidewater Marine in 1971. Tidewater Inc. donated the building to Tulane University in 1993. The building is the home to the Tulane University School of Public Health and Tropical Medicine. A few other Tulane offices are housed there as well. Tulane replaced all external signage which read "Tidewater" with signs that read "Tulane University School of Public Health and Tropical Medicine."

WWOZ, radio station 90.7 FM in New Orleans, has its antenna and transmitter atop the building.

As a result of the deluge from the levees breaking during Hurricane Katrina in August 2005, the building suffered from approximately four feet of floodwaters on the ground floor. Repopulation of the building began in November 2005. The building reopened in January 2006.

Location
1440 Canal StreetNew Orleans, LA 70112

The building is located at the corner of Canal Street and LaSalle Street.

Zone: Medical District
Neighborhood: Central Business District
District: French Quarter/CBD

See also
 List of tallest buildings in New Orleans
 Tulane University School of Public Health & Tropical Medicine

References
Footnotes

Sources
 Tulane University School of Public Health building information
 Tidewater timeline
 Emporis profile

Skyscraper office buildings in New Orleans
Tulane University buildings
Office buildings completed in 1971